An independence referendum is a type of referendum in which the residents of a territory decide whether the territory should become an independent sovereign state. An independence referendum that results in a vote for independence does not always ultimately result in independence.

Procedure
An independence referendum typically arises first after political success for nationalists of a territory. This could come in the election of politicians or parties with separatist policies, or from pressure from nationalist organisations.

Negotiations
Negotiations for the terms of an independence referendum may take place between the nationalists and the government which exercises sovereignty over the territory. If terms can be agreed, then the independence referendum can be held with its result binding, and respected by the international community. Independence referendums can be held without the consent of a national or the federal governments, then the international community will rely on several other factors, e.g. were the local people oppressed by the central government or not, to decide if the result can be recognized or not.

Various issues can be discussed in negotiations, such as the date and timing of the poll, as well as voter eligibility. For these instances, common electoral practice is often widely used, although there can be deviations, as seen with the lowering of the voting age for the 2014 Scottish independence referendum.

Other issues to be negotiated include what question or questions should be on the ballot, and what the voting options could be. Independence referendums can offer options of greater autonomy as well as, or instead of, the status quo. They can also put forward other constitutional questions to ballot. The questions that referendums ask may be revised if parties involved in negotiations consider them to be too leading.

Negotiations notably need to address what would make a result binding. For some independence referendums, a simple majority is required for one option. In other cases, a quota can be used, where a certain percentage of the vote or the electorate needs to be in favour of an option for it to be binding.

Successful negotiations can be hard to achieve for nationalists, as governments can be reluctant to give up sovereignty. For example, nationalists planned to hold a referendum in Catalonia in 2014, but met opposition from the Spanish government. As a result, the referendum that went ahead was unofficial and non-binding.

Aftermath
In the event of a vote for independence, there may be negotiations on the terms of secession for the territory from the sovereign state. A declaration of independence for a new state is then made, and international recognition can follow, as well as membership of international organisations such as the United Nations. In cases involving non-binding referendums, this can lead to a unilateral declaration of independence, and therefore partially recognised or self-proclaimed states, like the Donbas status referendums.

In the event of a vote against independence, there may still be a strong nationalist movement and calls for there to be a rerun of the independence referendum. For example, after two referendums in Quebec, the Parti Québécois has continued to raise the prospect of holding another referendum, and the Scottish National Party has said that there should be a repeat of the 2014 referendum now that the United Kingdom has left the European Union.

Past independence referendums

See also

Balkanization
Declaration of independence
Unilateral declaration of independence
Decolonization
Ethnic nationalism
Independence movement
Kosovo independence precedent
List of irredentist claims or disputes
List of monarchy referendums
List of proposed state mergers
List of sovereign states
List of territorial disputes
Lists of active separatist movements
Political status
Right to exist
Secession
Self-determination
Self-governance
Sovereignty
Succession of states
Territorial integrity
Wars of national liberation

Further reading
Harguindéguy, J.-B., Sánchez, E. S., & Sánchez, A. S. (2021). "Why do central states accept holding independence referendums? Analyzing the role of state peripheries." Electoral Studies.
Juve J. Cortés Rivera (2020) "Creating new states: the strategic use of referendums in secession movements." Territory, Politics, Governance

References

 
Secession
Independence